Juan José Ossandón Briceño (born 2 November 1977) is a Chilean former footballer.

He played for Deportes Copiapó.

External links
 Profile at BDFA 
 
 Juan José Ossandón at PlaymakerStats.com

1977 births
Living people
People from Copiapó
Chilean footballers
Chilean expatriate footballers
Club Deportivo Palestino footballers
Deportes La Serena footballers
Deportes Magallanes footballers
Magallanes footballers
Universidad de Concepción footballers
Alianza F.C. footballers
Deportes Copiapó footballers
Lota Schwager footballers
Chilean Primera División players
Primera B de Chile players
Salvadoran Primera División players
Chilean expatriate sportspeople in El Salvador
Expatriate footballers in El Salvador
Association football forwards